Series 34 of University Challenge began on 13 September 2004 and was broadcast on BBC Two. This is a list of the matches played, their scores, and outcomes.

Results
 Winning teams are highlighted in bold.
 Teams with green scores (winners) returned in the next round, while those with red scores (losers) were eliminated.
 Teams with orange scores have lost, but survived as highest scoring losers.
 A score in italics indicates a match decided on a tie-breaker question.

First round

Highest Scoring Losers Playoffs

Second round

Quarterfinals

Semifinals

Final

 The trophy and title were awarded to the Corpus Christi team comprising Nick Sharp, Stefano Mariani, Charles Oakley and David Whitley.
 The trophy was presented by Pete Postlethwaite.

External links
Blanchflower Results Table from blanchflower.org

2005
2004 British television seasons
2005 British television seasons